Jerald Clayton Anderson (April 4, 1934 – January 7, 2014) was an American dentist and politician.

Born in Sunrise, Minnesota, Anderson received his bachelors and dentistry degrees from the University of Minnesota. He then served in the United States Army in the dentist corps 1959–1961. Anderson served in the Minnesota State Senate in 1971-1980 as a Democrat. He died in Oak Park Heights, Minnesota.

Notes

1934 births
2014 deaths
People from Chisago County, Minnesota
University of Minnesota School of Dentistry alumni
21st-century American dentists
Democratic Party Minnesota state senators
20th-century American dentists